Garden West is the main area of Jamshed Town in Karachi, Sindh, Pakistan.

There are several ethnic groups in Saddar Town including Muhajirs, Punjabis, Christians, Sindhis, Kashmiris, Seraikis, Pakhtuns, Balochs, Memons, Bohras and Ismailis.

The area is a 30-40 minutes drive from the city's Jinnah International Airport.

See also
 Garden East
 Saddar Town
 Karachi

References

External links

Neighbourhoods of Karachi